is a Japanese master of Shotokan karate. He has  won the JKA All-Japan championships for kumite. He is currently the Acting Executive Director of the Japan Karate Association.

Biography

Yasunori Ogura was born in Hokkaido, Japan on 21 January 1958. He studied at Taisho University. His karate training began during his 1st year of high school.

Competition
Yasunori Ogura has had considerable success in karate competition.

Major Tournament Success
3rd Shoto World Cup Karate Championship Tournament - 1st Place Group Kata
29th JKA All Japan Karate Championship (1986) - 1st Place Kumite
28th JKA All Japan Karate Championship (1985) - 2nd Place Kumite
27th JKA All Japan Karate Championship (1984) - 3rd Place Kumite

References

 

1958 births
Japanese male karateka
Karate coaches
Shotokan practitioners
Sportspeople from Hokkaido
Living people